Wilhelm Gueinzius ornithological collection sold to the museum of Leipzig University 
Ludwig Becker leaves Germany during the 1848 revolution. Many scientists left Europe at this time.
Thomas Richard Heywood Thomson and  William Allen publish A narrative of the expedition sent by Her Majesty's government to the river Niger, in 1841, under the command of Capt. H. D. Trotter, R.N
Hugh Edwin Strickland  publishes The Dodo and its Kindred 
Death of Ludwig Leichhardt
Joseph Wolf arrives in London and begins work at the British Museum

Ongoing events
Fauna Japonica

Birding and ornithology by year
1849 in science